The FIG Artistic Gymnastics Junior World Championships, or FIG World Junior Artistic Gymnastics Championships, is an artistic gymnastics competition organized by the International Gymnastics Federation (FIG). The inaugural edition was held in Győr, Hungary in June 2019. Subsequent championships are then to be held biannually in odd numbered years from 2021 onward. The 2021 edition was cancelled because of the COVID-19 pandemic. The next championships are scheduled for 2023.

Those eligible are girls aged 14–15 and boys aged 16–17. (There's also a proposal to let 18-year-old boys stay on junior level for that year's world championships. If they choose to compete at the junior worlds, they won't be able to compete at the senior ones, and vice versa. The proposal will be discussed at the FIG Council meeting in Namibia in May 2020.)

The programme of the junior worlds comprises eight boys' (team, all-around, floor exercise, pommel horse, rings, vault, parallel bars, horizontal bar) and six girls' disciplines (team, all-around, floor exercise, vault, uneven bars, balance beam), with a total of 14 sets of medals at stake.

Editions

Best results of top nations by event

Men's results

Only nations who have won a medal are listed.  Positions below 8 are not taken into account.

Women's results
Only nations who have won a medal are listed.  Positions below 8 are not taken into account.

See also 
 World Artistic Gymnastics Championships

References